The 2005 V8 Supercar season was the 46th year of touring car racing in Australia since the first runnings of the Australian Touring Car Championship and the fore-runner of the present day Bathurst 1000, the Armstrong 500.

There were 21 touring car race meetings held during 2005; a thirteen-round series for V8 Supercars, the 2005 V8 Supercar Championship Series (VCS), two of them endurance races; a seven-round second tier V8 Supercar series 2005 Holden Performance Driving Centre V8 Supercar Series (HVS) and V8 Supercar support programme event at the 2005 Australian Grand Prix.

Results and standings

Race calendar
The 2005 Australian touring car season consisted of 21 events.

QANTAS V8 Supercars GP 100 
This meeting was a support event of the 2005 Australian Grand Prix.

Holden Performance Driving Centre V8 Supercar Series

V8 Supercar Championship Series

References

Additional references can be found in linked event/series reports.

External links
 Official V8 Supercar site
 2005 Racing Results Archive 

 
Supercar seasons